The Cathedral of Saint Mary (Haitian Creole: Katedral Sen Mari) is the seat of the archbishop of the Roman Catholic Archdiocese of Miami. The cathedral is named for Mary, mother of Jesus, and is located at 7525 N.W. 2nd Avenue, Miami, Florida. Since June 2010, Archbishop Thomas Gerard Wenski has served as the archbishop of Miami, Rev. Christopher Marino is the cathedral's rector.

History

In August 1929, under the title of The Little River Mission Club, 14 men and women met in a store on Northeast 79th Street near 2nd Avenue to form a new parish. Bishop Patrick Barry of the St. Augustine Diocese (1922–1940) stated they would need 100 Catholic families for a parish. Three lots were purchased on the northwest corner of Northwest 2nd Avenue and Northwest 75th Street. In April 1930, ground was broken for a church. The first mass was celebrated in a wooden structure on July 20, 1930. Father William Wilkinson, S.J., of Gesu Church was the celebrant and Monsignor William Barry, P.A., pastor of St. Patrick's Church on Miami Beach, preached the homily.

In October 1930, Father Patrick Joseph Roche of County Limerick, Ireland was appointed the first pastor of St. Mary's Parish. The parish area was from 36th Street North to the Broward line and from Biscayne Bay west to the Dade County line. In 1931, a rectory was constructed on the north side of the church. A parish hall was constructed in 1935 on the north side of the rectory.

One week before Christmas in 1936, the church was moved to a property that had been purchased on the east side of Northwest 2nd Ave. and 75th Street. The wooden church was then remodeled and enlarged by moving the sanctuary back and adding two wings. Capacity after the remodeling was 600 persons. The first celebration in the renovated church was the Sacrament of Confirmation by Bishop Barry in February 1937.

In 1953, Father Roche retired, and Father Patrick J. O’Donoghue was appointed pastor. The groundbreaking ceremonies for a church were held in 1955. Cardinal Edward Mooney of Detroit dedicated the church building on January 27, 1957. The church dome was seven stories above the altar. A southwest corner tower was 12 stories tall.

On August 13, 1958, 16 counties of Southern Florida were detracted from the Diocese of St. Augustine to form the Diocese of Miami. St. Mary's Church was announced by the Vatican as the new Cathedral. On October 7, 1958, Auxiliary Bishop Coleman F. Carroll of Pittsburgh was installed as the first bishop of Miami. Shortly thereafter, renovations for the cathedral began and included the addition of a bronze bell weighing more than two tons, and the installation of the cathedral's first pipe organ.

In 1966, Monsignor David Bushey, the appointed rector, completed work on a rectory with offices and living quarters. A parish hall was built in 1967. On June 13, 1968, Bishop Coleman Carroll became the first archbishop of Miami and Metropolitan of the newly created province.

Final funeral services for Jackie Gleason were held at St. Mary's Cathedral in 1987.

Schools
The cathedral has a K-8 parish school, Saint Mary's Cathedral School. It opened in 1939. Its initial enrollment was 230. An influx of Cuban Americans came in the 1960s after the Cuban Revolution.

Leadership

Below are lists of individuals who have led the cathedral.

Diocese of Miami archbishops
 Archbishop Coleman Francis Carroll, D.D. (1958–1977)
 Archbishop Edward Anthony McCarthy, D.D. (1977–1994)
 Archbishop John Clement Favalora, D.D. (1994–2010)
 Archbishop Thomas Gerard Wenski, D.D. (2010–present)

Pastors and rectors
 Monsignor Patrick J. Roche, (1930–1953)
 Monsignor Patrick J. O’Donoghue, (1953–1966)
 Monsignor David E. Bushey, (1966–1970)
 Monsignor John J. Donnelly, (1971–1980)
 Monsignor Gerald T. LaCerra, (1980–1991)
 Monsignor Andrew A. Anderson, (1991–1999)
 Monsignor Terence E. Hogan, (1999–2012)
 Very Rev. Christopher Marino V.F. (2012–present)

See also
List of Catholic cathedrals in the United States
List of cathedrals in Florida
Saint Mary's Cathedral School (Miami, Florida)

References

External links

 Official Cathedral Site
 St. Mary Cathedral School
 Roman Catholic Archdiocese of Miami Official Site

Church buildings with domes
Christian organizations established in 1930
Roman Catholic churches completed in 1957
Mary in Miami
Roman Catholic churches in Miami
Roman Catholic churches in Florida
Roman Catholic Archdiocese of Miami
Spanish Revival architecture in Florida
1930 establishments in Florida
20th-century Roman Catholic church buildings in the United States